Roderick Moores (born April 9, 1949) was a Canadian politician. He represented the electoral district of Carbonear in the Newfoundland and Labrador House of Assembly from 1975 to 1982. He was a member of the Liberal Reform Party. He was born at Carbonear.

References

1949 births
Living people
Liberal Party of Newfoundland and Labrador MHAs
Newfoundland Reform Liberal Party MHAs